Heath is an Old English male given name, and surname, meaning "someone who lived at, on, or by, a moor or heath". It was the 936th most popular given name for males born in the United States in 2018, and was most popular in 2002 at 675th.

It may also refer to:

Surname
Adrian Heath (born 1961), English football player and manager
Anthony Heath (born 1942), British sociologist
Benjamin Heath (1704–1766), British scholar
Billy Heath (1869 – after 1895), English footballer
Brandon Heath (born 1978), American musician
Charles Heath (1785–1848), English engraver
Christopher Heath (disambiguation), multiple people
Chris Heath, British writer
Cuthbert Eden Heath (1859–1939), British insurer
Darren Heath (born 1968), motor sports photographer
David Martin "Dave" Heath (1931–2016), American documentary, humanist and street photographer
David Heath (born 1954), British politician
Deunte Heath (born 1985), American professional baseball player
David Heath (wrestler) (born 1969), American professional wrestler
Don Heath (born 1944), English football (soccer) player
Earline Heath King (1913–2011), American sculptor
Edward Heath (1916–2005), British politician; prime minister of the United Kingdom from 1970 to 1974
Edward Heath (New Orleans) (1819–1892), mayor of New Orleans from 1867 to 1868
Edward Bayard Heath (1888–1931), American aircraft engineer
Elliott Heath (born 1989), American distance runner
Eric Heath (disambiguation), multiple people
Frederick Heath-Caldwell (born Heath, 1858–1945), British Army officer and RAF general
Garrett Heath (born 1985), American distance runner
George M. Heath, American scientist
The Heath Brothers, American musicians:
Jimmy Heath (1926–2020)
Percy Heath (1923–2005)
Tootie Heath (born 1935)
Hollis Heath, American playwright and actress
Jeff Heath (1915–1975), Canadian baseball player
James Heath (disambiguation), multiple people
Joel Heath (born 1993), American football player
John Heath-Stubbs (1918–2006), English poet and translator
Joseph Heath (born 1967), Canadian philosopher
Josiah Marshall Heath (died 1851), English ornithologist, metallurgist and businessman 
Kenneth Heath (1919–1977), principal cellist with the London Symphony Orchestra
Lewis Heath (1885–1954), British general
Liam Heath, British sprint kayaker
Lillian Heath (1865–1962), American doctor
Lady Mary Heath (1896-1939), Irish aviator
Mary Jo Heath (born 1954), American radio host
Matt Heath (born 1981), English football (soccer) player
Matthew John Heath, an American mercenary
Michael Heath (cartoonist) (born 1935), British cartoonist
Michael Heath (disambiguation), multiple people
Mike Heath (born 1955), American baseball player
Monroe Heath (1827–1894), American politician
Neville Heath (1917–1946), British murderer
Nicholas Heath (c. 1501–1578), archbishop of York and Lord Chancellor
Nicholas Heath (director) (born 1959), British opera director
Percy Heath, (1923–2005), American jazz musician
Robert Heath (1575–1649), Attorney General of England, and founder of North Carolina 
Robert Galbraith Heath (1915–1999), psychiatrist who experimented on the brains of animals and patients
Rodney Heath (1884–1936), Australian tennis player
Rodney Heath (American football)
Roy Heath (1926–2008), Guyanese writer
Russ Heath (1926–2018), American artist 
Samantha Heath (born 1960), British politician
Stan Heath (born 1964), American basketball coach 
T. L. Heath, Sir Thomas Little Heath (1861–1940), British mathematician and historian of classical Greek mathematics
Ted Heath (bandleader) (1902–1969), British musician
Tobin Heath (born 1988), American football (soccer) player
Virginia Heath (born 1959), London-based New Zealand film director and academic
Westby Heath (1891–1961), English footballer
William Heath (1737–1814), American soldier and politician
William Heath (artist) (1795–1840), British artist and caricaturist

Given name

Heath Bell (born 1977), American baseball player
Heath Benedict (1983–2008), American football player
Heath Black (born 1979), Australian rules footballer
Heath Evans (born 1978), American football player
Heath Herring (born 1978), American martial artist
Heath L'Estrange (born 1985), Australian Rugby League player
Heath Lamberts (1941–2005), Broadway actor (born James Lancaster)
Heath Ledger (1979–2008), Australian actor
Heath MacQuarrie (1919–2002), Canadian politician, teacher, scholar, and writer
Heath Miller (born 1982), American football player
Heath Ramsay (born 1981), Australian swimmer
W. Heath Robinson (1872–1944), British cartoonist
Heath Rylance (born 1972), American football player
Heath Scotland (born 1980), Australian rules footballer
Heath Shuler (born 1971), Washington Redskins quarterback and later Democratic Party Representative for North Carolina, United States
Heath Slater (born Heath Miller, 1983), American pro wrestler currently known as Heath
Heath Streak (born 1974), Zimbabwean cricketer
Heath Thorpe (born 2000), Australian artistic gymnast

Stage name
Heath (musician) (Hiroshi Morie, born 1968), Japanese musician, songwriter and member of the band X Japan

See also
Heath (disambiguation)

References

Surnames
English-language surnames